The 2014 Milan–San Remo was the 105th running of the Milan–San Remo single-day monument classic cycling race. It was won in the sprint by Alexander Kristoff, ahead of Fabian Cancellara and Ben Swift.

Route and pre-race favourites

Race organisers initially introduced major changes to the route for the 2014 edition of the race, with the new Pompeiana climb being introduced between the existing Cipressa and Poggio climbs in the climax of the race, although the earlier climb of Le Mànie was taken out. This was seen to tip the balance of the race in favour of puncheurs and climbers rather than sprinters, with many sprinters including 2009 winner Mark Cavendish stating they would not compete. However, in February 2014 race organisers announced the new climb would not be used after all, due to poor weather conditions.

With no replacement climb, the route now resembled that of the 2007 edition, and seemed to now favour sprinters due to a flatter route than in previous years. Subsequently, the likes of Cavendish and André Greipel decided they would compete in the first monument of the season. Gerrans did not start the race, after being ruled out the day before due to illness.

Teams
As Milan–San Remo was a UCI World Tour event, all 18 UCI ProTeams were invited automatically and obligated to send a squad. Seven other squads were given wildcard places to the race, completing the 25-team peloton

The 25 teams that competed in the race were:

Race overview

The 2014 Milan San Remo was won by a powerful sprint from Alexander Kristoff of  who started his sprint with about 150m to go and surged clear of a fading Mark Cavendish. Fabian Cancellara of  finished 2nd for a 3rd time in this race and on the podium for a 5th time in seven years.

Ben Swift of  took a surprise 3rd place, ahead of Juan José Lobato and Mark Cavendish. Two of the pre-race favourites missed out towards the finish, with John Degenkolb puncturing as they hit the Poggio and André Greipel suffering from cramps after chasing to get back in the winning move on the descent of the Poggio.

The race was run in atrocious conditions with hail and heavy, freezing rain hammering the riders for hours. An early break of seven built up a considerable lead but they were reeled in as they hit the Cipressa and Vincenzo Nibali went on a surprise attack. He built up a lead of around 35 seconds from the peloton but was reeled in as the race exploded in to life on the Poggio, led by Katusha and Cannondale.

In the end it was a reduced group of some 27 riders that came to the finish and Kristoff was given a brilliant lead-out by his team-mate Luca Paolini and proved the strongest at the end of a really hard day in the saddle.

Kristoff may have been seen as an outsider and was odds of 80/1 in February before the route change reverted to favouring the sprinters. He was fancied by some though following his strong showing in the Tour of Oman and because of his liking for long, hard days in the saddle. He was 33/1 to win with the bookmakers on the day.

Results

References

External links

Milan–San Remo
Milan-San Remo
Milan-San Remo
Milan-San Remo
2014 in road cycling